The Sino-Japanese Friendship and Trade Treaty was the first treaty between Japan and the Qing Dynasty. It was signed on 13 September 1871 in Tientsin by Date Munenari and Plenipotentiary Li Hongzhang.

The treaty guaranteed the judiciary rights of Consuls, and fixed trade tariffs between the two countries.

The treaty was ratified in the spring of 1873 and was applied until the First Sino-Japanese War, which led to a renegotiation with the Treaty of Shimonoseki.

See also
People's Republic of China–Japan relations

Notes

China–Japan treaties
1871 treaties
Treaties of the Qing dynasty
Treaties of the Empire of Japan